Three ships of the United States Navy have been named Bold.

 , originally named Chief, was a minesweeper laid down on 27 August 1941 at South Bristol, Maine.
 , was a tugboat transferred to the United Kingdom on 29 June 1942.
 , was a minesweeper laid down 12 December 1951 and launched 14 March 1953.
 

United States Navy ship names